Antoni Konopelski (14 June 1929 – 28 February 1977) was a Polish footballer. He played in one match for the Poland national football team in 1956.

References

External links
 

1929 births
1977 deaths
Polish footballers
Poland international footballers
Place of birth missing
Association footballers not categorized by position